Kory Johnson is an American environmentalist from Arizona.

In 1991, while still a young girl, Johnson led a successful effort by Children for a Safe Environment to stop a hazardous waste dump being built in her local area.  In 1996 she joined Greenpeace and helped organize protests against trainloads of DDT-contaminated dirt into Arizona.

She was awarded the Goldman Environmental Prize in 1998, for her efforts against toxic and nuclear contamination.

References

American environmentalists
Living people
Year of birth missing (living people)
Goldman Environmental Prize awardees